GAM Esports is a professional League of Legends team competing in the Vietnam Championship Series (VCS), the highest level of competitive League of Legends in Vietnam. The team first rose to international prominence in 2017, after their exceptional performance at that year's Mid-Season Invitational (MSI).

History

2014 
The team was founded in May 2014 after companies Tt Esports and Boba Net began a sponsorship with Team Miracle, which renamed to the Boba Marines five months later. During the 2014 VCS Summer Split, the team played as Tt Miracle Boba and finished the split in eight place with a 3–4 record. However, they were able to avoid relegation after the addition of former Saigon Jokers support and World Championship participant Junie.

2015 
For the 2015 season, Archie, GoNy, and QTV rejoined their former teammates after leaving the Saigon Jokers, and the team renamed to the Boba Marines. The Marines failed to qualify for the spring split of the 2015 Garena Pro League (GPL), but did qualify for the summer split after finishing third in the 2015 VCS Spring Split. During the mid-season, the Marines replaced their mid laner Navy with Optimus from Saigon Fantastic Five. Despite showing improvement and winning the 2015 VCS Summer Split, the Marines were unable to win the 2015 GPL Summer Split.

2016 
In 2016, the Marines finished third in the 2016 VCS Spring Split and fourth in the 2016 Mountain Dew Championship Series Summer Split (MDCS; i.e. VCS). The GPL also changed their qualification guidelines so that only champions of regional SEA tournaments could participate, meaning the Marines were unable to participate in GPL 2016.

2017 
Before the 2017 season, the Marines' management made the decision to release their entire roster excluding Optimus and Archie. Afterwards, star players Ren, Levi, Slay, and Sergh joined the Marines as top, jungle, AD carry, and substitute support respectively. Tinikun also joined as head coach. The team received new sponsors, Gigabyte Technology and Adonis Icyber Gaming, and renamed to Marine Esports. As the GIGABYTE Marines, the team won the 2017 MDCS Spring Split and the 2017 GPL Spring Split without losing a single game, qualifying them for the 2017 Mid-Season Invitational (MSI).

At MSI 2017, the Marines finished the first round of the play-in group stage with a 5–1 record, only losing to Virtus.pro. In the second round, the Marines won the first two games of a best-of-five against Team SoloMid, before being reverse swept and losing 2–3. In the third and last qualifying round, the Marines beat SuperMassive eSports 3–1 to secure a spot in the main event. At the main event of MSI 2017 the Marines finished last in sixth place, with a 3–7 record. Despite their placement, the Marines' performance secured Vietnam a guaranteed group stage seed at the 2017 World Championships and an additional spot in the GPL.

The Marines were placed in Group B at the 2017 Worlds Championships, where they initially tied for second with Fnatic and Immortals, but had the highest seed going into the tiebreaker matches due to them having the shortest combined victory time. However, the Marines lost their tiebreaker match to Fnatic and did not advance to the knockout stage.

Shortly after the 2017 World Championships, Slay and Stark both announced they would be leaving the team. Optimus left the team post-season on 16 October 2017 and Levi joined American team 100 Thieves on 26 December 2017.

2018 
The Marines finished third in the 2018 VCS Spring Split regular season with 9 wins and 5 losses, qualifying for playoffs, where they defeated Young Generation 3–1 in the quarterfinals and UTM Esports 3–1 in the semifinals. The Marines then played in the finals against EVOS Esports, narrowly losing to them 2–3.

On 14 June 2018, the team officially renamed to GAM Esports due to sponsorship changes. GAM then placed fifth in the 2018 VCS Summer Split with 8 wins and 6 losses.

2019 
In Spring 2019, GAM Esports missed out on playoffs for the second time, finishing in fifth place with 6 wins and 8 losses. Levi rejoined the team from JD Gaming on 14 May 2019 for the 2019 VCS Summer Split. The Marines ended the summer regular season in first place with an 11–3 record, qualifying for playoffs once again. In the semifinals they swept Lowkey Esports 3–0, moving on to face Team Flash in the grand finals, who they beat in a 3-0 fashion. GAM Esports qualified for the 2019 World Championship, where they were placed in group B alongside FunPlus Phoenix, J Team, and Splyce. They finished last in their group with 1 win and 5 losses.

2020 
GAM Esports went through various changes in 2020, signing Dia1, Easylove, and Palette while releasing Zeros and Zin. The team placed first in the 2020 VCS Spring regular season with 13 wins and 1 loss, but placed second in playoffs following a 2-3 loss against Team Flash. Due to the ongoing COVID-19 pandemic, Riot Games organised the 2020 Mid-Season Showdown featuring the top 2 PCS and top 2 VCS teams to replace the annual Mid-Season Invitational. GAM Esports finished fourth, securing a single win against Team Flash.

In Summer 2020, GAM Esports once again finished first in the regular season, securing 12 wins and 2 losses. During playoffs, GAM Esports lost against Team Flash twice to place second in the event. Despite securing a spot at the 2020 World Championship, GAM Esports and Team Flash did not attend the event due to the pandemic. It was later announced that the teams would still receive 2.1 percent of the prize-pool.

Current roster

Tournament results

Notes

References

External links 
 

2014 establishments in Vietnam
Esports teams established in 2014
Esports teams based in Vietnam
Vietnam Championship Series teams